Gary Taylor-Fletcher (né Fletcher, born 4 June 1981) is an English former professional footballer. He has scored in each of the top five divisions of English football. He has been known as Gary Taylor-Fletcher since his marriage to Viv Taylor in June 2004.

Taylor-Fletcher began his senior career at Northwich Victoria in 1999, and made 43 league appearances whilst at the club. Towards the end of his time there, he had a brief loan spell with Hull City, before switching permanently to Leyton Orient in June 2001. He struggled to break into the Leyton Orient team, and spent a loan spell at Grays Athletic, and two at Dagenham & Redbridge. In August 2003, after 21 league appearances for Leyton Orient, Taylor-Fletcher joined Lincoln City; a successful spell saw him play 90 league games in two seasons. He then moved to Huddersfield Town in June 2005, making 81 league appearances in two seasons. Taylor-Fletcher then joined Blackpool in July 2007, and established himself as a regular player for the club. After 215 league appearances for Blackpool, he joined Leicester City in September 2013.

Career

Roofing
Born in Widnes, Taylor-Fletcher pursued a successful career in roofing It was during this time he was spotted by scouts of Conference National club Northwich Victoria while playing a charity friendly against a local team made up of labourers.

Northwich Victoria
He began his career playing semi-professional football (as Gary Fletcher) with Northwich Victoria in 1999, with whom he scored eighteen goals in 43 appearances. On 16 March 2001 he went on loan to Hull City who were then in the Third Division, the fourth tier of the Football League, where he made five appearances in two months at the club.

Leyton Orient
On 8 June 2001 Fletcher was signed by another Third Division club, Leyton Orient from Northwich for a fee of £50,000 as he had scored twice against them. Later that year he was sent out on loan to Grays Athletic who were then in the Isthmian League. Fletcher scored three goals in four league games in a loan spell that lasted from 21 December 2001 to 1 March 2002. In October, he spent a month on loan at Conference National club Dagenham & Redbridge, before returning for a second loan spell in December, staying until March 2003.

Lincoln City
On 14 August 2003 he signed for Lincoln City on a free transfer, where he was reunited with former Northwich Victoria coach Keith Alexander. In two years with the Imps Taylor-Fletcher made 90 appearances scoring thirty goals. At the start of the 2004–05 season he equalled a 106-year-old club record when he scored in all six opening games. He also won the Supporters Player of the Year award for the 2003–04 season and played for them in the Football League Two play-off final in May 2005, which they lost to Southend United.

Huddersfield Town
Taylor-Fletcher was acquired by Huddersfield Town on a free transfer from Lincoln City on 14 June 2005. He scored a hat-trick against Chesterfield in the League Cup.

During October and November, Taylor-Fletcher was consistently competing with strikers Paweł Abbott and Andy Booth for a place in the starting line-up, and on most occasions he had to settle for a place on the bench. However, during late December, he came off the bench to score two last-minute equalisers against Rotherham United and Barnsley.

In the New Year, Town manager, Peter Jackson used him as a right winger, and he scored the majority of the team's goals in the 2006–07 season. On 8 August 2006, Taylor-Fletcher scored the 500,000th goal in The Football League, with a 25-yard drive into the top-left corner, to lead the Terriers to a 3–0 home victory over Rotherham United.

In January 2006, he scored against Chelsea in an FA Cup third-round match at Stamford Bridge, which, for seven minutes, put Town on level terms with the Premier League champions.

Towards the end of the season, he scored some more crucial goals against Barnsley and AFC Bournemouth, before scoring Town's only goal in the first leg of the play-offs against Barnsley at Oakwell.

Blackpool
On 9 July 2007, Taylor-Fletcher signed for Blackpool for an undisclosed fee in a two-year deal, ahead of the Seasiders first season back in the second tier of English football since 1978. He made his debut in the Championship in the club's first league match of the 2007–08 season, a 1–0 win over Leicester City at the Walkers Stadium on 11 August 2007. He scored his first goal for the club two weeks later, on 25 August, in a 2–1 defeat to Wolverhampton Wanderers at the Molineux Stadium, and went on to score six goals that season. On 20 September 2008 he scored at St Andrew's as Blackpool beat Birmingham City 1–0. In doing so, he became the first player to score against the Blues in the League at St Andrew's in the 2008–09 season and also help Blackpool become the first club to beat them at home since Chelsea in the Premier League in January.

In his first league start since 20 October 2009, Taylor-Fletcher scored twice in a 3–0 win over Middlesbrough at the Riverside Stadium on 8 December. His 100th league appearance for Blackpool came on 9 February 2010, in a 2–0 defeat to Sheffield Wednesday at Hillsborough.

Taylor-Fletcher scored in the 39th minute of the 2010 Football League Championship play-off Final against Cardiff City on 22 May 2010. Blackpool were the victors, thus completing Taylor-Fletcher's journey from non-League football to the Premier League since the turn of the millennium.

On 14 August 2010, he scored Blackpool's first-ever Premier League goal, in a 4–0 win over Wigan Athletic on the opening day of the 2010–11 season at the DW Stadium. Twelve months later, Taylor-Fletcher also scored the first goal (for Blackpool and in all) of the 2011–12 Football League season, in a single-goal victory against Hull City at the KC Stadium. He was released in the summer of 2013 after his Blackpool contract expired, his exit coinciding with a downturn in Blackpool's fortunes.

Leicester City
On 20 September 2013, Taylor-Fletcher joined Leicester City on a one-year deal. He made his debut just a day later coming on as a late substitute against his former side Blackpool. He scored his first goal for the Foxes in a 5–3 win over Bolton Wanderers at the King Power Stadium. Taylor-Fletcher made 21 appearances in the league (23 in all competitions), scoring three goals, as Leicester were promoted to the Premier League as champions. On 8 May, he extended his contract by a further year.

Despite his new contract, Taylor-Fletcher was omitted from Leicester's 25-man squad for the 2014–15 Premier League season. On 25 October 2014 he joined Sheffield Wednesday on a month-long loan. The following February, he joined Championship strugglers Millwall on loan for the rest of the season, signed by his former Blackpool manager Ian Holloway.

Later career
On 17 October 2015, Taylor-Fletcher signed for National League side Tranmere Rovers on a short-term deal 30 minutes before kick-off against league leaders Forest Green Rovers. He scored in the fifth minute of his Rovers debut, which Tranmere won 2–0.

On 3 October 2016 he signed for Accrington Stanley on a non-contract deal. He made his debut on 4 October 2016 in the newly revamped EFL Trophy, scoring a goal in Accrington's 4–1 win over Chesterfield.

He became caretaker player-manager of Bangor City in March 2017, stepping down to assistant manager when the club appointed Kevin Nicholson in May 2017. The pair led the club to a second-placed finish in the Welsh Premier League during the 2017–18 season but left Bangor in May 2018 after the club was demoted after failing to obtain a tier one license.

He signed for Llandudno in November 2018, and scored twice on his debut in a 4–2 defeat to Bala Town. On 27 November 2018, he returned to Bangor as manager. He also played for the club in the Cymru Alliance. On 7 May 2019, Taylor-Fletcher was appointed manager of Llandudno. Two days later, Taylor-Fletcher resigned due to business commitments.

He retired from football in June 2019.

Coaching career
In August 2020, Taylor-Fletcher revealed that he would be moving to New York to take up a permanent coaching role with the National Centre of Excellence (NCE).

In September 2022, Taylor-Fletcher was appointed joint-manager of Northern Premier League Premier Division side Nantwich Town with Ritchie Sutton following a spell as interim manager. The duo left the club in February 2023, with Nantwich sitting in the relegation zone, three points from safety.

Career statistics

Honours
Blackpool
Football League Championship play-offs: 2009–10

Leicester City
Football League Championship: 2013–14

References

External links
Gary Taylor-Fletcher player profile at blackpoolfc.co.uk

1981 births
Living people
Association football forwards
Bangor City F.C. managers
Bangor City F.C. players
Blackpool F.C. players
Cymru Alliance players
Cymru Premier managers
Cymru Premier players
Dagenham & Redbridge F.C. players
English Football League players
English football managers
English footballers
Footballers from Widnes
Grays Athletic F.C. players
Huddersfield Town A.F.C. players
Hull City A.F.C. players
Isthmian League players
Leicester City F.C. players
Leyton Orient F.C. players
Lincoln City F.C. players
Llandudno F.C. managers
Llandudno F.C. players
Millwall F.C. players
Nantwich Town F.C. managers
National League (English football) players
Northwich Victoria F.C. players
Premier League players
Sheffield Wednesday F.C. players
Tranmere Rovers F.C. players